{{DISPLAYTITLE:C22H27FN4O2}}
The molecular formula C22H27FN4O2 (molar mass: 398.47 g/mol) may refer to:

 DPA-714, or N,N-diethyl-2-[4-(2-fluoroethoxy)phenyl]-5,7-dimethylpyrazolo[1,5-a]pyrimidine-3-acetamide
 Sunitinib

Molecular formulas